John Mayor may refer to:
John Mayor (brewer) (1735–1817), English brewer, Member of Parliament for Abingdon, and civil servant
John Eyton Bickersteth Mayor (1825–1910), English classical scholar
John Major (philosopher) (1467–1550), also spelled John Mayor, Scottish philosopher

See also
John Maher (disambiguation)
John Mair (disambiguation)
John Mayer (disambiguation)
John Meier (disambiguation)
John Meyer (disambiguation)